The Marnes de Dives is a geological formation in Normandy, France. It dates back to the upper part of the Callovian stage of the Middle Jurassic. And is partially equivalent to the Oxford Clay in England. It predominantly consists of ooidal marl, rich in pyrite and lignite, interbedded with thin limestone horizons. It is best exposed at the base of the Falaises des Vaches Noires (Cliffs of Black Cows) as well as the foreshore at low tide. It is known for its fossils, notably those of ammonites, marine crocodiles and fragmentary remains of dinosaurs, mostly theropods.

Vertebrate fauna

See also
 List of dinosaur-bearing rock formations

References

Geologic formations of France
Middle Jurassic Europe
Jurassic France
Callovian Stage
Jurassic System of Europe